Sabine Ohmes (born August 12, 1974), better known by her stage name Encore!, is a German singer who performs mainly in French. Ohmes adopted her stage name after her debut as the vocalist on the Sash! track "Encore une fois", which reached No. 2 on the UK Singles Chart.

Musical career
She reached No. 12 as a soloist in the UK with her own track "Le Disc Jockey"  and later released the single "Le Paradis". Both songs were written by Sash!'s producers, Ralf Kappmeier and Thomas Lüdke (known as the Tokapi production team).

Encore! also worked with Sash! singing on the track "Le Soleil Noir" on their third album, Trilenium. The song was later mixed and unsuccessfully released solely by Encore!.

References

External links

1974 births
German trance musicians
Living people
21st-century German women singers
French-language singers of Germany